E. Kinney Zalesne is an American writer, strategist, and former business executive. Until October 2021 she was the General Manager for Responsible Growth Strategy at Microsoft, after having co-led Microsoft's Corporate Strategy team for five years. Before that, Zalesne was the CEO of Zalesne LLC, an advisory firm specializing in CEO positioning, communications strategy, and thought-leadership development.  She was also Counsel to U.S. Attorney General Janet Reno, a White House Fellow with Vice President Al Gore, and the collaborator on the bestselling book Microtrends: The Small Forces Behind Tomorrow's Big Changes and The Wall Street Journal column of the same name.

Personal life

Education and family
Zalesne is the youngest of three children born to Judy and Harvey Zalesne of Bryn Mawr, Pennsylvania.  She attended the Baldwin School, where she was president of student government and played varsity field hockey, basketball, and lacrosse. In 1998, she won the Distinguished Young Alumna Award from The Baldwin School.

Zalesne graduated from Yale University magna cum laude and Harvard Law School cum laude. 
At Harvard Law School, she was a classmate and friend of President Barack Obama. 
  
In 1998, Zalesne married Scott Siff, a communications strategist, brand consultant, and lawyer.  They live with their four children in Washington, D.C.

Essays
In 2020, Zalesne co-wrote an essay with Rabbi David Wolpe in the Los Angeles Review of Books entitled, "What Would Martin Buber Think of Zoom?" 

In 2021, she wrote "From College Prep to Mideast Peace: Stop Talking and Start Collaborating" in The Christian Science Monitor.

In 2022, she wrote "'It's Fragile Work' - Conflict Resolution for World Leaders - and Families" with one of her teenage daughters, also in The Christian Science Monitor.

Additional essays can be seen at www.kinneyzalesne.com.

Career

Microsoft
In 2013, Zalesne joined Microsoft as a Principal Strategist. In 2015, she was promoted to General Manager, reporting to Executive Vice President for Strategy and Planning Kurt DelBene. In 2020, she was named Microsoft's General Manager of Responsible Growth Strategy.

Zalesne LLC
In 2009, Zalesne founded Zalesne LLC, an advisory firm that specialized in CEO positioning, strategic communications, and thought leadership development.  The firm's clients included Fortune 500 CEOs, CEOs of fast-growing start-ups, university presidents, leading social entrepreneurs, and political leaders.

Political consulting
As a Senior Consultant with Penn, Schoen & Berland, Zalesne helped develop the strategy for the successful presidential campaign of Bill Clinton in 1996, the successful United States Senate campaign of Hillary Clinton in 2006, and the unsuccessful presidential campaign of Hillary Clinton in 2008.

In 2020, in her personal capacity, Zalesne helped write and gather co-signers for an Open Letter to America's Working Women, published in Business Insider, in support of Joe Biden and Kamala Harris. Co-signers included Meg Whitman, Susan Molinari, and Reshma Saujani.

In 2021, in connection with Democratic National Committee Chair Jaime Harrison, she founded the Women's Executive Network, a group of mostly businesswomen who meet monthly with female Governors, Senators, and other key leaders around the nation.

Microtrends
In 2006 and 2007, Zalesne collaborated with Mark Penn on the bestselling book Microtrends: The Small Forces Behind Tomorrow's Big Changes.  The New York Times called it "the perfect bible for a game of not-so-trivial pursuits concerning the hidden sociological truths of modern times," and The Economist said it should be read "for its dozens of social insights that could well be turned to profit." It was named a New York Times bestseller and a Wall Street Journal Business Bestseller.  Zalesne spoke about the book on many national radio and television programs, including MSNBC's The Tucker Carlson Show. 
She was also the keynote speaker at dozens of conferences and conventions. She is represented by the Leigh Bureau.

Following the success of the book, Zalesne collaborated on the regular Microtrends column in The Wall Street Journal. She also wrote about trends for national and international publications, including Business Week and the Financial Times.

Social entrepreneurship
In 2000, Zalesne became president of College Summit, which was named U.S Social Entrepreneur of the Year at Davos in 2008.  With the organization's other leaders, Zalesne was featured in David Bornstein's 2007 book, How to Change the World:  Social Entrepreneurs and the Power of New Ideas.

Zalesne has since co-authored two white papers with College Summit founder J.B. Schramm, "The Promise of Proficiency:  How College Proficiency Information Can Help High Schools Drive Student Success" and "Seizing the Measurement Moment: Why Now is the Time for States to Help High Schools Get the Measurement Data They Need and Want."  In 2009, Schramm and Zalesne co-authored a New York Times op-ed titled "High School's Last Test."

From 2004 through 2005, Zalesne served as Executive Vice President for the U.S. at Hillel: The Foundation for Jewish Campus Life. During that period, Zalesne was one of a handful of executives featured in the Jewish Telegraphic Agency's "Portraits of Leadership."

Government service
From 1991 to 1993, Zalesne served as a judicial law clerk to the Honorable J. William Ditter, Jr., an appointee of President Richard Nixon. 
She then became an Assistant District Attorney for the City of Philadelphia,  where she worked on the landmark case of Commonwealth of Pennsylvania v. Mumia Abu-Jamal and discussed the case on NPR's Talk of the Nation.

In 1995-96, Zalesne was one of 14 Americans appointed by President Bill Clinton to be a White House Fellow.  She served in the Domestic Policy Office of Vice President Gore.

In 1997, Zalesne joined the U.S. Department of Justice as its point-person on juvenile justice legislation, and in 1998 was named Counsel to U.S. Attorney General Janet Reno. In 2003, Zalesne was quoted in The New York Times about the contrast between Reno and her successor, U.S. Attorney General John Ashcroft.

Board service
Zalesne is on the executive committee of Heart of a Nation, a nonprofit that brings together Americans, Israelis, and Palestinians to make all three societies better. She is also a Past President of the White House Fellows Foundation and Association and served as chair of the White House Fellows 2012 Leadership Conference. She is Past President of the Jewish Primary Day School of the Nation's Capital, now known as the Milton Gottesman Jewish Day School of the Nation's Capital. She was a founding National Board Member of Eli's Mishpacha, the Jewish alumni of Yale, and has also served on the boards of the Baldwin School, the Jewish Publication Society, and Gladwyne Montessori School; and on Board Committees of Adas Israel Congregation and Momentum.

References

External links
 KinneyZalesne.com
 Microtrending.com
 Biden-Harris Letter in Business Insider
 Buber essay -LA Review of Books
 Christian Science Monitor essay

Living people
American consultants
White House Fellows
Microsoft people
Yale University alumni
Harvard Law School alumni
The Wall Street Journal people
American women chief executives
American chief executives
The Baldwin School alumni
Year of birth missing (living people)
21st-century American women